Paul Emery (12 November 1916 – 3 February 1993) was a racing driver from England.

Emery was born in Chiswick, London.  He built a number of front wheel drive 500cc Formula 3 cars named Emeryson and drove them himself. He participated in two World Championship Formula One Grands Prix, debuting on 14 July 1956 and numerous non-Championship Formula One races.  He scored no championship points.

Emery died in Epsom, Surrey, aged 76.

Complete Formula One World Championship results
(key)

External links
Paul Emery profile at The 500 Owners Association

1916 births
1993 deaths
English racing drivers
English Formula One drivers
Emeryson Formula One drivers
Connaught Formula One drivers
Formula One team owners